Omar Ibrahim Hammad is a Sudanese footballer who plays . He plays as a right winger.

Club career statistics
Statistics accurate as of 21 August 2012

1Includes Emir of Qatar Cup.
2Includes Sheikh Jassem Cup.
3Includes AFC Champions League.

External links

Player profile - QSL.com.qa

References

1986 births
Living people
Sudanese footballers
Sudanese expatriate footballers
Sudanese expatriate sportspeople in Qatar
Al Ahli SC (Doha) players
Al-Arabi SC (Qatar) players
Al-Sailiya SC players
Umm Salal SC players
Association football wingers